In computer graphics programming, hit-testing (hit detection, picking, or pick correlation ) is the process of determining whether a user-controlled cursor (such as a mouse cursor or touch-point on a touch-screen interface) intersects a given graphical object (such as a shape, line, or curve) drawn on the screen. Hit-testing may be performed on the movement or activation of a mouse or other pointing device.

Hit-testing is used by GUI environments to respond to user actions, such as selecting a menu item or a target in a game based on its visual location. In Web programming languages such as HTML, SVG, and CSS, this is associated with the concept of pointer-events (e.g. user-initiated cursor movement or object selection).

Collision detection is a related concept for detecting intersections of two or more different graphical objects, rather than intersection of a cursor with one or more graphical objects.

Algorithm
There are many different algorithms that may be used to perform hit-testing, with different performance or accuracy outcomes. One common hit-test algorithm is presented in the pseudo-code below:
function HitTest(Rectangle r1, Rectangle r2) returns boolean
{
    return ((r1.X + r1.Width >= r2.X) and (r1.X <= r2.X + r2.Width) and (r1.Y + r1.Height >= r2.Y) and (r1.Y <= r2.Y + r2.Height));
}

In Python:
def hit_test(r1: Rectangle, r2: Rectangle) -> bool:
    """Return true if it hits else return false."""
    return (
        (r1.x + r1.width >= r2.x)
        and (r1.x <= r2.x + r2.width)
        and (r1.y + r1.Height >= r2.y)
        and (r1.y <= r2.y + r2.height)
    )

See also
Point in polygon
Computational geometry
Collision detection
User interface

References

External links 
 MSDN: Hit Testing in the Visual Layer
 MSDN: Hit Testing Lines and Curves

Computer graphics
User interfaces
Video game development